USS Pinola may refer to the following ships of the United States Navy:

   a 691-ton Unadilla-class screw steam gunboat serving from 1862 to 1865
  a Bagaduce-class fleet tug built in 1919 and stricken 1946
  a Sotoyomo-class auxiliary fleet tug built in 1944 and transferred to South Korea in 1962

Pinola